The Bush was a mail-order car made by the Bush Motor Company of Chicago from 1916 to 1924. Bush Motors did no manufacturing but bought in cars from other makers. Lycoming and Continental motors were often used for the 4- and 6-cylinder versions of the car. Amongst others, cars were made by Huffman and Piedmont, as well as the Norwalk Motor Car Company, Martinsburg, West Virginia ( operating from  1912-1922 )

American companies established in 1916
Defunct motor vehicle manufacturers of the United States
History of Chicago
Vehicle manufacturing companies established in 1916
Defunct companies based in Chicago